The following Bulldogs have been selected as First Team All-Americans, to participate in college all-star teams, or were members of the Drake All-Century Team.

First Team All-Americans

All-Star game appearances

All-Century Team

See also
 Drake Bulldogs football
 Drake Bulldogs

References

External links
 Official Drake Athletic Web Site

Lists of college football All-Americans
Drake Bulldogs football honorees